Best in the World may refer to:

IFBB Best in the World, a former IFBB professional bodybuilding competition
ROH Best in the World, an annual professional wrestling event held by Ring of Honor
Bryan Danielson (Daniel Bryan), professional wrestler who called himself the "Best in the World"
CM Punk, professional wrestler who called himself the "Best in the World"
Chris Jericho, professional wrestler who claims himself to be the "Best in the World at what I do"
Shane McMahon, professional wrestler who called himself the "Best in the World" after winning the 2018 WWE World Cup at the 2018 edition of Crown Jewel